Matthew Scott (born 30 September 1990) is a Scottish rugby union player with 39 caps for Scotland who plays for Leicester Tigers in England's Premiership Rugby. His regular playing position is Centre.

Early life
Scott was born in Dunfermline, Scotland. He was deputy head boy at Currie High School. In 2008 he embarked on full-time study at the University of Edinburgh while developing as a rugby player. He graduated with a law degree in 2013.

Scott had impressed in the 2010–11 season as a Scotland age-grade internationalist and his part in Currie's recent rise to prominence, domestically in Premier 1 and the British and Irish Cup. Before signing, Scott represented Scotland at under-19 and under-20 in 2009 and 2010 respectively.

Scott played for Edinburgh's district interstate u-17 and u-18 teams.

Club career
In April 2011 Scott joined Edinburgh as an elite development player.

Scott made his competitive début on 2 September 2011 against Cardiff Blues. His first try came against 2010–11 Celtic League winners Munster after he dummied and cut inside, before palming off two Munster defenders to score under the posts.

Since then he has become a familiar feature for Edinburgh, combining his upbringing as a stand-off with his strength in the tackle to great effect as a play-making centre with an eye for the try line. Having become a regular feature in the Edinburgh Rugby midfield, Scott signed a contract extension in October 2012 that will keep him at the club until 2015.

By the middle of January 2016 he had played 70 times for Edinburgh and had scored 14 tries. On 16 January 2016, an announcement that Scott had signed for Aviva Premiership side Gloucester, to join for the start of the 2016–17 season. His last match for Edinburgh was against the Cardiff Blues on 7 May 2016.

On 21 February 2018, Scott re-signed with his hometown club Edinburgh back in the Pro14, on a two-year deal ahead of the 2018–19 season .

On 29 April 2020 it was confirmed Scott will join English side Leicester Tigers from the 2020–21 season. Scott played as a replacement in the 2022 Premiership Rugby final as Tigers beat Saracens 15-12. On 13 January 2023, Scott scored two tries as Leicester beat ASM Clermont Auvergne 44-29 away to qualify for the 2022–23 European Rugby Champions Cup round-of-16.

International career
Before going pro, Scott represented Scotland at under-19 and under-20 in 2009 and 2010 respectively.

Scott made his age-grade international debut in the 55–13 success against Italy at Lasswade, Edinburgh, in March 2009, followed by the Dourdan match against France a month later. In 2010 he was recalled to the representative set-up for Scotland's under-20 6 Nations, playing in all but one match, featuring as a replacement in each of the four 6NC matches before playing in a further five Junior world Championship matches in Argentina.

Scott made a try-scoring debut for Scotland A in February 2012 in the 35–0 win over England Saxons at Netherdale. The following month he gained his first international cap, coming on as a replacement in the RBS Six Nations match versus Ireland at the Aviva Stadium. His first start for Scotland came in June, on tour against Australia. In the 2013 Six Nations Championship he started at inside centre in all of Scotland's matches. He appeared for Scotland in a mini-tournament in South Africa in the same year. He went on Scotland's tour to Japan in 2016.

References

External links
biography at Gloucester Rugby

1990 births
Living people
Scottish rugby union players
Edinburgh Rugby players
Rugby union players from Dunfermline
Alumni of the University of Edinburgh
Scotland international rugby union players
Rugby union centres
People educated at Currie High School
Currie RFC players
Scotland Club XV international rugby union players
Leicester Tigers players
Gloucester Rugby players